Little Indian River may refer to:

 Little Indian River (Alaska), a tributary in the Yukon River system
 Little Indian River (Michigan)